The Heartless Control Everything is the third EP from the American post-hardcore band The Chiodos Bros, later known simply as Chiodos. It was released January 25, 2003 on the label Search and Rescue Records. Craig Owens, Matt Goddard. The title is a reference to the popular selling PS2 video game Kingdom Hearts, whereat the villains in the game are called the 'Heartless'.

Track listing

Personnel
 Craig Owens: Vocals
 Bradley Bell: Keyboard and Backing Vocals
 Chip Kelly: Guitar
 Pat McManaman: Guitar
 Matt Goddard: Bass
 Crosby Clark: Drums

Reversed Lyrics
At the beginning of "The Lover and the Liar" there are fast-spoken, backwards lyrics that when reversed again are revealed to be "How does it feel to know that you've taken someone's smile?". Spoken by lead singer Craig Owens.

References

External links 
 Official artist website
 Official record label website

Chiodos albums
2003 debut EPs